Phi Sigma Alpha, commonly known as La Sigma, is a Puerto Rican fraternity originally established as the Sigma Delta Alpha Fraternity (Sociedad de Amigos) on October 22, 1928, at the University of Puerto Rico by 12 students and a professor. Phi Sigma Alpha can trace its roots back to 1898 to the Union Hispano Americana, as well as to the first ever Greek letter Hispanic-oriented fraternity, Sigma Iota, established in 1912.  By 1998 there were over 4,376 members.

History

Origins 1898-1928

Phi Sigma Alpha traces its origins to a number of organizations including Phi Lambda Alpha.  Phi Lambda Alpha fraternity was founded at the University of California, Berkeley, in 1919. The fraternity was the result of a merger of three societies: Pi Delta Phi Fraternity at Massachusetts Institute of Technology (MIT), founded in 1916; Phi Lambda Alpha Fraternity, founded in 1919 at the University of California, Berkeley; and the Unión Hispano Americana, founded in 1898, at Rensselaer Polytechnic Institute, Troy, New York. This last one was the first Latin-American student society formed in the USA;  A group of Latin American students organized the Unión Hispano Americana (UHA) as a cultural and intellectual secret society based on the ideology of Pan-Americanism.

After ΦΛΑ was organized, other societies joined it: the "Club Latino-Americano", founded in 1919 at Colorado School of Mines; the "Federación Latino-Americana", founded in 1926 at Columbia University and which joined in 1928; the "Club Hispania" of Cornell University, founded in 1929, and which joined in 1931; the "Club Hispano-Americano" of Tri-State College in Angola, Indiana, founded in 1921, and which joined in 1929, and the Alfa Tenoxtitlan Militant chapter (founded in 1929) whose members had come from the former ΦΛΑ society in Mexico City, Mexico.

Sigma Iota fraternity was founded in Baton Rouge, Louisiana, on March 2, 1912, previously known as the Sociedad Hispano Americana, which was founded in the University of Louisiana in 1904. Between 1912 and 1925, Sigma Iota expanded rapidly in the United States, South America, and Europe. As a result of this, Sigma Iota became the first international Latin American-based fraternity.
Sigma Iota and Phi Lambda Alpha joined and became Phi Iota Alpha in 1931. In 1932, Phi Iota Alpha reorganized and formed the Union Latino Americana (ULA) as its overall governing body, dividing their member fraternities in Latin America into zones according to the country they represented.

The Sigma 1928-1934

Sigma Delta Alpha fraternity was established by 12 students and a professor on October 22, 1928, at the University of Puerto Rico at the Glorieta Fabián. The founding members included Santos P. Amadeo (professor of law), Juan Figueroa, Fernando Jiménez, Hugo D. Storer, Joaquin Velilla, Victor M. Sánchez, Adalberto Carrasquillo, Diego Guerrero Noble, Samuel L. Rodríguez, José Laracuente, Charles H. Juliá, Gilberto del Valle and Gilberto Alemar.

Originally the name Kappa Delta Alpha was considered but it was quickly changed to Sigma Delta Alpha.  By December 5, 1928, they established their Chapter House where they began celebrating their meetings.

For many years, Sigma Delta Alpha enjoyed a certain amount of notoriety not enjoyed by other student organizations at the university. Its membership included four of the most important student leadership positions at the university: the Yearbook editor, the senior class president, the Athletic Society president, and the ROTC Battalion Commander.  Every activity sponsored by the school administration was consulted with the Sigma Delta Alpha chapter president at the university in Río Piedras.  In 1929, the Beta Chapter at the Colegio de Mayagüez (University of Puerto Rico at Mayagüez) was established; thus the original chapter came to be known as Alpha.

The union 1934 - 1939

Phi Sigma Alpha had its first reorganization with the merger between the Alpha Boriquen Militant chapter of Phi Iota Alpha and Sigma Delta Alpha of the University of Puerto Rico in 1934.  The Puerto Rican zone came to be when the Alpha Boriquen Militant Chapter was founded in San Juan, Puerto Rico, on March 4, 1934, by former members of Phi Iota Alpha.

Under the conditions stated above, a movement came about to unite Sigma Delta Alpha with the Alpha Boriquen Militant Chapter of Phi Iota Alpha. It was not an easy task since many of the Sigma Delta Alpha members did not want the change or to alter their history.  But the decision was made and thus the Phi Sigma Alpha Zone of the Union Latino Americana came to be. A "Zone Directive" was created and a constitution was drafted, since there was no central body to control the fraternity.

By 1937, the ULA had several well-established and functional zones including:
 ΦΙΑ - Phi Iota Alpha in the United States
 ΦΚΑ - Phi Kappa Alpha in Cuba
 ΦΣΑ - Phi Sigma Alpha in Puerto Rico
 ΦΤΑ - Phi Tau Alpha in Mexico

ULA held its last Convention on January 7–8, 1938. Delegates from the United States, Cuba and the Puerto Rico zones were present. At the convention, agreement could not be reached over the ideals of the fraternity.  After the convention, each zone considered the matter independently. The USA zone decided that the ideals of the ULA ought to be Pan-Americanism (the unification of Latin America by a system of confederacy) and led its members towards a position of pro-independence as it related to Puerto Rico, while the Cuban zone did not reach a decision on their own and ultimately decide to go along with the ideals conceptualized by the USA zone.

The Puerto Rico zone rejected this decision because it considered the introduction of political issues to be detrimental to the fraternity.  Thus on September 25, 1938, the Phi Sigma Alpha Zone withdrew from the Union Latino Americana. The ULA dissolved shortly after.

The era of growth 1939 - 1964
Like the members of the Sigma, a majority of the members of the Chapter of Phi Iota Alpha of the University of Louisiana, disillusioned with character given to their brotherhood, withdrew from the Fraternity and, in April, 1939, founded Sigma Iota Alpha,  a fraternity composed of Latin students of that University. As it was to be expected this new grouping was received with distrust by the other Latin fraternal organizations at the university. Since Phi Sigma Alpha was organized in Puerto Rico with ideals similar to those of the Sigma Iota Alpha in Louisiana, and since both organizations were the product of almost identical former brotherhoods, negotiations were immediately started to merge the two brotherhoods into one. This was decided in a convention celebrated on September 10, 1939, at the University of Puerto Rico, organizing themselves as "Fraternidad Sigma" (Sigma Fraternity) with two ramifications: Phi Sigma Alpha Zone in Puerto Rico and Sigma Iota Alpha Zone in Louisiana (Later the USA Zone's name was changed to Phi Sigma Beta Zone and came to include other universities in north Louisiana).

The Phi Sigma Alpha Zone was organized by a board of directors of the zone, the Militant chapter Alpha Boriquén of San Juan, and two university chapters, one at U.P.R.-Río Piedras and another one at the U.P.R.-Mayagüez (then known as the Colegio de Agricultura y Artes Mecanicas de Mayagüez (CAAM)). Years later the militant chapters of Ponce and Mayagüez were also organized.

The Sigma Iota Alpha Zone (Phi Sigma Beta) was made up of the Alpha chapter in the University of Louisiana. In 1941, the Beta chapter in the city of Baltimore, Maryland, was organized. It was composed of students of various nearby universities, including Georgetown, University of Maryland, University of Baltimore, Johns Hopkins, and George Washington University.

With time it became increasingly more difficult to sustain a fully functional zone in the United States, while pretending it worked as well as the zone one in Puerto Rico. A reformist movement arose abroad that culminated in 1964 with the establishment of the Phi Sigma Alpha Fraternity composed of active and militant chapters that can be found in Puerto Rico, in the United States or abroad. Therefore, the model based on zones was abolished and eliminated.

The era of progress and adaptations (1964) 

Puerto Rico felt economic boom of the post Second World War years, and this boom was also evident in its universities. Puerto Rican youth registered in Puerto Rican universities in record numbers, and the Fraternity, which acted as the suppliers of the union between its young people and an escape from arduous studies, also offered student housing. During the next two decades, Sigma enjoyed extensive enrollment in the original chapters as well as the new ones that were beginning to develop. While the baby boom effect declined dramatically in the late 1970s /early 1980s, it resurged at the end of the 1980s, and continuing until the beginnings of the 1990s.

The 1990s brought an era of mandated accountability of fraternities, partly resulting from the deaths of two young cadets of the quasi-fraternal group the "Panthers" of the ROTC in the CAAM, and also a damages lawsuit perpetrated against another island fraternity. This brought forth a law, which can be found in Article 125 of the New Puerto Rico Penal Code, to control the initiation processes or "hazing" and to protect candidates. The Sigma Brotherhood, which since 1959 had prohibited in its processes the use of the "Pledge Paddle", achieved another "first"  from its prohibition of acts against the physical and mental dignity of the neophyte even before Article 125 was enacted.

The Sigma has continued its emphasis throughout the years on the areas of community and social work by its active and militant chapters which regularly take part in blood drives and fund-raising activities for different organizations.  The "Beca Sigma" (Sigma Scholarship) program has been re-established and promises to offer young Puerto Ricans of scarce resources the opportunity to receive a university education.

Organization
The fraternity's highest administrative body is the "Junta de Directores", or Board of Directors.  This body is composed of two groups. The first is the "Comité Ejecutivo Central" (Central Executive Committee) which includes the fraternity president, vice president and others. The second group is composed of the regional presidents, and the presidents and secretaries of all the fraternity chapters, alumni and active members. All members have an equal vote. The Board of Directors meets several times a year, as convened by the fraternity president.  As of 2010, there were six regions, with the ones in Puerto Rico named after their main city: San Juan Region, Guayama Region, Ponce Region, Arecibo Region, Mayagüez Region, and the USA Region, based in Florida.

Headquarters

Phi Sigma Alpha's main headquarters are located at the corner of Calle Mejico and Calle Chile in Hato Rey, Puerto Rico.  The offices are located in the Alpha Boriquen Chapter's clubhouse, known as Casa Club Sigma.  Its restaurant has operated uninterrupted since 1968.  Its activity halls are rented out for meetings and events held by  many organizations.  The clubhouse has two main activity halls and two smaller ones, which can all be opened up to create one big room, or used individually.

There is also a bar and restaurant area, called Vale's Place, reserved for fraternity members and their guest. In the back of the Casa Club Sigma is a basketball court. There used to be a swimming pool as well, but it has been paved over to provide additional parking area.  The main offices of the fraternity are on the second floor of the building. On the back is the Pub Sigma, which is used by the Alfa Omega Activo chapter for their meetings and social events.

Sigma Foundation

The "Fundación Sigma" (Sigma Foundation) is a non profit organization, established to offer Puerto Rican youth of limited resources and those of outstanding academical records the opportunity to cover part of their university expenses.  Through different fraternity activities, carried out to raise funds, the organization seeks to be fiscally responsible as the basis to fulfill its philanthropic goals.

The fraternity collaborates and contributes to different organizations, mainly to the "Fondita de Jesus", the American Red Cross, American Cancer Society and  "Centro Espibi" in Mayagüez.  Various golf tournaments are held to raise funds for charities. The Beta Boriquen chapter coordinates one such tournament with the Mayagüez Rotary Club.

Chapters
The fraternity has both university and alumni chapters.  The university chapters are named by a Greek letter (depending on their order of founding), followed by the word "activo" (active). The alumni chapters follow the same nomenclature, except that instead "activo" they are called "boriquén".  Brothers in active chapters are called "activos" and alumni Brothers are called "militantes" (militants).  Yet all Brothers call each other "Sigmas".

Notes

 * ΑΩ-Activo Chapter was originally two chapters located in SJ, PR;  Α-Activo at UPR Río Piedras and Ω-Activo at Inter American U at SJ; the chapters merged.
 * Epsilon Activo Chapter was originally at UPR, Medical Sciences Campus, but after years of inactivity it was re-opened in 2007 at the Polytechnic University of Puerto Rico.

Notable members

The group has had among its members many respected Puerto Ricans and Latin Americans.

See also

 Phi Iota Alpha
 Phi Lambda Alpha
 Sigma Iota
 Union Latino Americana
 Concilio Interfraternitario Puertorriqueño de la Florida
 Puerto Rican fraternities and sororities

References

External links
 National home page

 
Concilio Interfraternitario Puertorriqueño de la Florida
Fraternities and sororities in Puerto Rico
Phi Iota Alpha
International student societies
1928 establishments in Puerto Rico
Student organizations established in 1928
Latino fraternities and sororities